Bob Mellor was an English football coach who managed Oldham Athletic. He also served as club secretary, and worked for the club for 43 years.

References

Year of birth missing
Year of death missing
English football managers
Oldham Athletic A.F.C. non-playing staff
Oldham Athletic A.F.C. managers